Charing Cross and Westminster Medical School existed as a legal entity for 13 years, as the midpoint of a series of mergers which strategically consolidated the many small medical schools in west London into one large institution under the aegis of Imperial College London.

In 1984, Charing Cross Hospital Medical School and Westminster Hospital Medical School merged to form the Charing Cross and Westminster Medical School. This move was part of a series of mergers in the London medical schools in the early 1980s, which foreshadowed the second, larger round of mergers in the late 1990s.

Based at the Charing Cross Hospital site in Hammersmith and Chelsea and Westminster Hospital in Chelsea, the new medical school took the form of its larger precursor (CXHMS) in using "X" as an abbreviation for "Cross". The medical school also maintained academic units at the university hospitals of Queen Mary's Roehampton, West Middlesex, Ashford and Hillingdon.

In 1997, CXWMS merged with Imperial College, London (whose medical department was at St Mary's Hospital Medical School), The National Heart and Lung Institute and the Royal Postgraduate Medical School  to form Imperial College School of Medicine.

Student life

Students' Union based around the Reynolds Bar.  CXWSU merged in Imperial College School of Medicine Students' Union in 1997.

Deans

Notable alumni

 Mark Porter - The Times and Radio 4 doctor
 Dawn Harper - Embarrassing Bodies on Channel 4
 Gary O'Driscoll - Arsenal team doctor
 Ayan Panja - Presenter of Health Check on BBC World News
 Fintan Coyle - Presenter of Speakeasy and inventor of "The Weakest Link"
 Masood Ahmed - Chief Medical Officer, Black Country & West Birmingham CCG, former Global Medical Director for Dell
 Andy Cole - Orthopaedic Surgeon Southampton and SAC advisor
 Laura Waters - HIV Consultant, Chair of BHIVA and columnist for Boyz magazine

References

External links
CXWMS on Facebook

Medical schools in London
History of Imperial College London
United Hospitals
Imperial College School of Medicine